The South Georgia Classic was a golf tournament on the Web.com Tour from 2007 to 2014. It was played at Kinderlou Forest Golf Club in Valdosta, Georgia, United States.

The 2014 purse was $650,000, with $117,000 going to the winner.

Winners

Bolded golfers graduated to the PGA Tour via the Web.com Tour regular-season money list.

References

External links

Coverage on the Web.com Tour's official site

Former Korn Ferry Tour events
Golf in Georgia (U.S. state)
Valdosta, Georgia
Recurring sporting events established in 2007
Recurring sporting events disestablished in 2014
2007 establishments in Georgia (U.S. state)
2014 disestablishments in Georgia (U.S. state)